Poliakoff is a surname, a variant of Polyakov. It may refer to:
Alexander Poliakoff, Russian-born British electronics engineer, inventor and businessman, father of Martyn and Stephen
Élie de Poliakoff, Russian-born equestrian
Joseph Poliakoff, Russian-born British telephone and sound engineer and inventor, father of Alexander
Martyn Poliakoff, Professor of Chemistry at the University of Nottingham, brother of Stephen
Nicolai Poliakoff, British clown, born in Latvia
Serge Poliakoff, Russian-born French modernist painter
Stephen Poliakoff, British playwright, director and scriptwriter, brother of Martyn
Marina Catherine de Poliakoff-Baydaroff, birth name of Marina Vlady, French actress, sister of Odile
Étiennette de Poliakoff-Baydaroff, birth name of Odile Versois, French actress, sister of Marina

See also
 

Russian-language surnames
Ethnonymic surnames